Clionella lobatopsis is a species of sea snail, a marine gastropod mollusk in the family Clavatulidae.

Clavatula lobatopsis Barnard, 1963, was transferred to Gemmula (Ptychosyrinx) in the Turrinae by Kilburn (1983)

Description

Distribution
This marine species occurs off the West Cape Province, Rep. South Africa

References

 Barnard, Keppel Harcourt. Deep sea Mollusca from west of Cape Point, South Africa. South African Museum, 1963.

Endemic fauna of South Africa
lobatopsis
Gastropods described in 1963